"Quick Escape" is a song by American rock band Pearl Jam. The song was released on March 25, 2020, as the third single from their eleventh studio album, Gigaton (2020).

Charts

References

2020 singles
2020 songs
Pearl Jam songs
Songs written by Eddie Vedder
Songs written by Jeff Ament
Monkeywrench Records singles